Wilbrand's knee: Inferonasal fibres of the optic nerve which go into the contralateral optic nerve 4 mm before crossing over to the opposite optic tract. 
A lesion here produces a junctional scotoma in the superior temporal field of the optic nerve opposite the site of injury.

References

Optic nerve